The Holy Cows, FRC team 1538,  is a FIRST Robotics Competition team that was founded in 2005, and is a school-based team from High Tech High in San Diego California.

Recognition

Chairmans Award 

The Holy Cows received the highest award of the FIRST program, the Chairmans award on April 27, 2013 at the St. Louis World Championships. Upon winning the award, the team was inducted to the FIRST Hall of Fame, and garnered both regional and national recognition from the FIRST community. Additionally, the awards grants an automatic invitation for the team to every future world championship.

San Diego Regional 

Since 2009, The Holy Cows have won the Chairman's Award at the San Diego Regional for five consecutive years (as of December 2013). Additionally, the team has won numerous other awards through its career, both at the San Diego Regional and other competitions.

Outreach

Battle at The Border 

Starting in 2011, High Tech High's The Holy Cows and Francis Parker School's W.A.R. Lords (We Are Robot Lords) began hosting an off-season FIRST Robotics Competition. Known as The Battle at the Border, the event is intended to allow rookie teams to engage in a simulated competition, prior to the start of the next year's official season. Additionally, teams are encouraged to use the event to familiarize new students with the program.

Fall Workshops 

The Holy Cows host the Fall Workshops at High Tech High annually. The event is intended for other FRC teams, and offers a wide variety of lectures focusing on various aspects of the FRC program.

2013 Macy's Thanksgiving Day Parade 

In 2013, The Holy Cows and four other FRC teams lead the 87th Macy's Thanksgiving Day Parade, including: Team 16; The Bomb Squad, Team 180; S.P.A.M., Team 25; Raider Robotix, and Team 1477; Texas Torque. The teams represented the FIRST program, and brought awareness to a national audience.

References 

FIRST Robotics Competition teams